Jack S. Jossey (born Julian S. Jossey c1893 - 21 November 1952 ) was an American film producer and businessman.  A Seagram stockholder, he helped finance and film many exploitation films during the 1940s, including Mom and Dad and The Prince of Peace.

References

 Joe Bob Briggs, "Kroger Babb's Roadshow." Reason, November 2003.
 Felicia Feaster and Bret Wood, Forbidden Fruit: The Golden Age of Exploitation Film. (Baltimore, Maryland: Midnight Marquee Press, 1999. )
 David F. Friedman, A Youth in Babylon: Confessions of a Trash-Film King. (Buffalo, New York: Prometheus Books, 1990. )
 Internet Movie Database: J. S. Jossey. URL accessed May 7, 2007.
 Eric Schaefer, Bold! Daring! Shocking! True!: A History of Exploitation Films, 1919–1959. (Durham, N.C.: Duke University Press, 1999. )

American film producers
1890s births
Year of birth missing
1952 deaths